James Robert Shawkey (December 4, 1890 – December 31, 1980) was an American baseball pitcher who played fifteen seasons in Major League Baseball (MLB).  He played for the Philadelphia Athletics and New York Yankees from 1915 to 1927.  He batted and threw right-handed and served primarily as a starting pitcher.

Early life
Shawkey was born to John William Shawkey (descended from German immigrants named Schaake) and Sarah Catherine Anthony, in Sigel, Pennsylvania.

Professional career
He moved from Slippery Rock State College to an independent league in 1911, then to the American League in 1912 as a pitcher for Connie Mack's Philadelphia Athletics. In 1915, Mack sold him to the New York Yankees where he remained (except for a brief service with the U.S. Navy during World War I when he served on the battleship Arkansas for eight months) until 1931.

At the start of the  season, Shawkey was chosen to be the Yankees' Opening Day starting pitcher.  Because the team's first game was at home, this also meant that he was the first player to pitch at the newly built Yankee Stadium.  The Yankees won 4–1 behind Babe Ruth's three-run home run, with Shawkey pitching a complete game to become the first winning pitcher at the stadium.

Shawkey also served as the Yankees' manager in the  season—following the sudden death of Miller Huggins—and guided the Yankees to a third-place finish.

Shawkey won 195 games in his career, and won 20 or more games in four of his seasons (his high was 24). Shawkey is noted as the starting pitcher in the first game played in Yankee Stadium on April 18, 1923, and set the franchise record for 15 strikeouts in a single game, which stood until Ron Guidry broke it in 1978. Bob credited his success to a super fastball and an outstanding curve ball. He later served as the baseball coach for Dartmouth College.

An adept batsman during his 15 year career, Shawkey compiled a .214 batting average (225-for-1049) with 90 runs, 3 home runs and 95 RBI. From 1920-1924, he drove in 59 runs for the New York Yankees. In 8 World Series games, he hit .267 (4-for-15) with 2 RBI.

In 1970, Shawkey was inducted into the Pennsylvania Sports Hall of Fame in Brookville, Pennsylvania. During the 1976 opening day festivities for the renovated Yankee Stadium, Shawkey threw out the ceremonial first pitch. He died at age 90 in Syracuse, New York, on New Year's Eve 1980.

Managerial record

See also
 List of Major League Baseball annual ERA leaders
 List of Major League Baseball annual saves leaders

References

External links

 Interview with baseball player Bob Shawkey conducted by Eugene C. Murdock on April 15, 1975, in Syracuse, NY. (1 hr., 45 min. in 3 parts), available on the Cleveland Public Library's Digital Gallery:
 Part One of Three
 Part Two of Three
 Part Three of Three

1890 births
1980 deaths
American expatriate baseball players in Canada
Major League Baseball pitchers
Philadelphia Athletics players
New York Yankees players
New York Yankees coaches
New York Yankees managers
Pittsburgh Pirates scouts
American League ERA champions
Harrisburg Senators players
Baltimore Orioles (IL) players
Montreal Royals players
Jersey City Skeeters players
Newark Bears (IL) players
Dartmouth Big Green baseball coaches
Slippery Rock baseball players
Baseball players from Pennsylvania
American people of German descent
Watertown Athletics players
Burials at Oakwood Cemetery (Syracuse, New York)